Punnapra North is a panchayat and part of Punnapra. It is in Alappuzha district, Kerala, India. Borders are Alappuzha municipality in north, nedumudy panchayth in east, punnapra south panchayath in south and Arabian sea in west.

References 

Places in Alappuzha district